This is a list of areas in Kingston upon Hull, England.

Within Hull unitary authority

East Hull
 Bilton Grange Estate
 Bransholme
 Drypool
 Garrison Side
 The Groves
 Garden Village
 Kingswood
 Longhill
 Marfleet
 Greatfield Estate
 Preston Road Estate
 Southcoates
 Stoneferry
 Summergangs
 Sutton Ings
 Sutton-on-Hull
 Victoria Dock Village
 Wilmington

West Hull
 Anlaby Common
 Anlaby Park
 East Ella
 The Avenues
 Dairycoates
 Gipsyville
 Inglemire
 Newland
 Newland Park
 North Hull Estate
 Orchard Park Estate
 Sculcoates
 Stepney

Outside the unitary authority

Suburbs of Hull
 Anlaby
 Anlaby Common
 Kirk Ella
 Willerby

Satellite towns and villages
 Bilton
 Cottingham
 Dunswell
 Hedon
 Hessle
 Preston
 Salt End
 Swanland
 Wawne

Geography of Kingston upon Hull
Kingston upon Hull
Geography of the East Riding of Yorkshire
Areas
 List